The Church of Jesus Christ of Latter-day Saints in Palau refers to the Church of Jesus Christ of Latter-day Saints (LDS Church) and its members in Palau. The first known missionaries arrived on July 5, 1978. As of December 31, 2021, there were 521 members in one branch in Palau. A church family history center shares the same building as the branch.

History

Besides serviceman passing through by way of the islands during World War II, there was no record of Latter-day Saints visiting Palau prior to October 15, 1977 when Heber Butler, a counselor in the Honolulu Mission, visited to investigate the potential for missionary work. The first known missionaries arrived on July 5, 1978. On April 1, 1980, the Palau Branch was formed. The Palau Branch was later renamed the Meyungs Branch.

By 1989, there was 4 small branches and 208 members. A chapel was dedicated in Meyungs in May 1990. The population of these branches included several mainland Chinese workers. The chapel was later torn down after the branch was dissolved, as most of the branches were dissolved to give greater strength to the Koror Topside Branch after several members returned to China. The branch was renamed the Koror Branch in 2010, and the branch was assigned to the Barrigada Guam Stake in September 2018.

Congregations
As of February 2023, there was a single congregation, the Koror Branch, in Palau. This branch is located within the Barrigada Guam Stake.

Temples
Palau is currently in the Yigo Guam Temple district.

See also
Religion in Palau

References

External links
 The Church of Jesus Christ of Latter-day Saints - Official Site (English)
 The Church of Jesus Christ of Latter-day Saints Newsroom - Guam & Micronesia (Including Palau)
 ComeUntoChrist.org Latter-day Saints Visitor site

The Church of Jesus Christ of Latter-day Saints in Oceania